Ravenna Township is one of the eighteen civil townships of Portage County, Ohio, United States.  The 2020 census found 8,980 people in the township.

Geography
Located in the center of the county, it borders the following townships and city:
Shalersville Township - north
Freedom Township - northeast corner
Charlestown Township - east
Edinburg Township - southeast corner
Rootstown Township - south
Brimfield Township - southwest corner
Franklin Township - west
Streetsboro - northwest corner

The city of Ravenna, the county seat of Portage County, which became independent of the township in 1993, is surrounded by Ravenna Township.

Name and history
It is the only Ravenna Township statewide. In the western part of the township along Ohio State Route 59 is the unincorporated town of Black Horse (or Blackhorse), named after the Blackhorse Tavern that was located there in the 19th century.

Government
The township is governed by a three-member board of trustees, who are elected in November of odd-numbered years to a four-year term beginning on the following January 1. Two are elected in the year after the presidential election and one is elected in the year before it. There is also an elected township fiscal officer, who serves a four-year term beginning on April 1 of the year after the election, which is held in November of the year before the presidential election. Vacancies in the fiscal officership or on the board of trustees are filled by the remaining trustees.

Notable people
Randi Clites, representative for the 75th district of the Ohio House of Representatives since 2019

References

External links

Townships in Portage County, Ohio
Townships in Ohio